The Premio Friuli Storia (Friuli Book Prize for Contemporary History) is an annual Italian literary award established in 2013 to promote standards of excellence in the writing of history books for a general readership. It is the only national Italian literary prize for non-fiction which entrusts the selection of the winner to a committee of non-specialist readers.

Regulations 

A scientific committee composed of academic historians produces a shortlist of books each year at the end of May. For the period 2017-2019, the committee is chaired by Tommaso Piffer and composed of Elena Aga Rossi, Roberto Chiarini, Ernesto Galli della Loggia, Ilaria Pavan, Paolo Pezzino, Silvio Pons, Andrea Possieri and Andrea Zannini. The winner is selected by a group of 300 readers and the final result is announced in September in Udine.

List of shortlisted books 

(The winner of each competition is highlighted in bold)

 2022
 Claudia Weber,  Il patto. Stalin, Hitler e la storia di un’alleanza mortale  (Einaudi, 2021)
 Gianluca Falanga,  La diplomazia oscura. Servizi segreti e terrorismo nella Guerra fredda  (Carocci, 2021)
 Paolo Macry,  Storia di fuoco. Patrioti, militanti, terroristi  (Il Mulino, 2021)
 2021
  Jacopo Lorenzini,  L'elmo di Scipio. Storie del Risorgimento in uniforme  (Salerno)
 Paolo Nello,  Storia dell'Italia fascista  (Il Mulino)
 Volker Ulrich,  1945. Otto giorni a maggio. Dalla morte di Hitler alla fine del Terzo Reich. L'ultima settimana della Seconda guerra mondiale  (Feltrinelli)
 2020
  István Deák,  Europa a processo. Collaborazione, resistenza e giustizia fra guerra e dopoguerra  (Il Mulino)
 Carmine Pinto,  La guerra per il Mezzogiorno. Italiani, borbonici e briganti. 1860-1870  (Laterzia)
 Antonella Salomoni,  Le ceneri di Babij Jar. L'eccidio degli ebrei di Kiev  (Il Mulino)
 2019
  Raoul Pupo, Fiume citta di passione (Laterza)
 Francesco Benigno,  Terrore e terrorismo. Saggio storico sulla violenza politica  (Einaudi)
 Michele Colucci,  Storia dell'immigrazione straniera in Italia. Dal 1945 ai nostri giorni  (Carocci)
 2018
  Marco Mondini, Il Capo. La Grande Guerra del generale Luigi Cadorna (Il Mulino)
 Emanuele Ertola,  In terra d'Africa. Gli italiani che colonizzarono l'impero  (Laterza)
 Marco Monte,  La grande carestia del 1813-1817 in Friuli. L'ultima grande crisi di sussistenza del mondo occidentale  (Gaspari)
 2017
  Maria Teresa Giusti,  La campagna di Russia. 1941-1943 (Il Mulino)
 Tiziano Bonazzi,  Abraham Lincoln. Un dramma americano  (Il Mulino)
 Piero Craveri,  L’arte del non governo. L'inesorabile declino della Repubblica italiana  (Marsilio)
 2016
 Vladimiro Satta, I nemici della Repubblica. Storia degli anni di piombo (Rizzoli)
 Ettore Cinnella, Ucraina. Il genocidio dimenticato (1932-1933) (Della Porta)
 Silvia Salvatici, Nel nome degli altri. Storia dell'umanitarismo internazionale (Il Mulino)
 2015
 Leonardo Campus, I sei giorni che sconvolsero il mondo. La crisi dei missili di Cuba e le sue percezioni internazionali (Le Monnier)
 2014
 Lucia Ceci, L'interesse superiore. Il Vaticano e l'Italia di Mussolini (Laterza)
 Anna Foa, Portico d'Ottavia n. 13. Una casa del ghetto nel lungo inverno del ’43 (Laterza)
 Gian Enrico Rusconi, 1914: attacco a Occidente (Il Mulino).

See also

 List of history awards

External links 

 Official website

References

Friuli Storia
History awards
Awards established in 2013
2013 establishments in Italy